Jeremy David Williams (born 11 November 1982) is a British film, radio, television and theatre actor.

Life and career
Jeremy David Williams was born in Birmingham, England and educated at King Edward VI Five Ways School.

Radio
In 2008 Jeremy David Williams worked on several radio dramas with the Bunbury Banter Theatre Company in association with Hayes FM including Slow Boat To Freedom playing Gareth, Aliens from Uranus playing Captain Fire and From Venus with Love playing Wylie Foxx. Previous to this Jeremy David Williams performed in a BBC Radio play Kinky Hair playing Alistair Devlin.

As a presenter, 2008 saw him hosting his own show J.Arts on London's JCOM, profiling up and comings in the arts scene. 2009 he returns to presenting alongside Clive Roslin - Sunday mornings on JNET.

As of 2020 he presents a show on Gorgeous FM called Jeremy's Not Your Sunday Girl.

Theatre
Having made his adult stage debut in 'Road' at the Audimax, Hamburg, Jeremy David Williams then performed in self-penned Poppycock! at the 2005 Edinburgh Festival. 2006-7 saw him as a regular with Midlands-based Rep company Struts, undertaking roles in Twelfth Night, Blood Wedding, Les Liaisons Dangereuses and The B.F.G. 2007 also saw his RSC debut, performing in Pippo Delbono's Henry V at the Courtyard Theatre, Stratford-upon-Avon. From July to August 2008 he appeared in Counterfeit Skin at the Courtyard Theatre, London. He has appeared in Genet's The Maids in three separate occasions - the first two times as Claire (2007, 2008) and switching across to Solange (2009).

Modelling
Jeremy David Williams has also worked as a photo model on several occasions (photographers inc. Paul Schnarrs, Richie Mullen and Andrew Moscardo-Parker).

Jeremy David Williams features in 6 out of 10 images in Levi Miller's 2010 Image Range. The image "Sleeping To Dream" which sees Williams lying in just boxers on a bed has garnered international media attention, including a full page feature in Britain's Gay Times and Germany's Blu.

Writing
As a writer, Jeremy David Williams is now editor of the leading entertainment internet magazine - The Kaje. Prior to this he has had several poems published and was featured in the Top 100 Poets from the Midlands in 2007. He has written for publications including D'Ash, Zap!Bang!, Fly, Maverick, Who's Jack?, Heeb and Renaissance.

Music
2009 saw Jeremy David Williams form half of the novelty act J-Proc, whose single "A Christmas Song (Stuff the Turkey)" joined the Christmas chart race.

2010 saw Jeremy David Williams join forces with Harriet Telfer in the group Knock Twice. Their single "I Heart You" is released on 8 February 2010 in aid of the British Heart Foundation.

Filmography

References

External links

 http://the-kaje.com/ 
 https://web.archive.org/web/20150329031209/http://boxrec.com/list_bouts.php?human_id=4763&cat=boxer

1982 births
English male film actors
English male stage actors
English male television actors
Living people
Royal Shakespeare Company members
People educated at King Edward VI Five Ways